Royston may refer to:

Places

Australia
Royston, Queensland, a rural locality

Canada
Royston, British Columbia, a small hamlet

England
Royston, Hertfordshire, a town and civil parish, formerly partly in Cambridgeshire
Royston, South Yorkshire, a suburban village, near Barnsley, and Wakefield
Royston Vasey, a fictional town in the television series The League of Gentlemen

Scotland
Royston, Glasgow, a district of Glasgow, traditionally known as Garngad

United States
Royston, Georgia, a town
Royston, Texas, a ghost town

Surname 
Royston is an English Toponymic Surname, and comes from a place in South Yorkshire named Royston.

People
Royston Drenthe (born 1987), Dutch football player
Royston Ellis (born 1941), English writer
Royston Ffrench (born 1975), British jockey
Royston Evans (1884–1977), Australian cricketer and soccer player, commonly known as Mac Evans
Royston Gabe-Jones (1906–1965), Welsh cricketer
Royston or Roy Goodacre (born 1967), British Microbiologist and Analytical Chemist
Royston Nash, English conductor
Royston Tan (born 1976), Singaporean film-maker
Royston Vasey, real name of English comedian Roy 'Chubby' Brown
Henry Royston (1819–1873), English cricketer
Ivor Royston, American physician and entrepreneur
Brigadier General John Royston (1860–1942), South African-born British army officer
Richard Royston (1601-1686), English bookseller and publisher
Robert Royston (1918–2008), master landscape architect
Shad Royston (born 1982), Australian rugby league player

See also
Royston crow, another name of the hooded crow
Royston Town F.C., an English football club in Hertfordshire
Craigroyston F.C., a Scottish football side
Craigroyston Community High School